Cosmic Ark is an Atari 2600 game designed by Rob Fulop and published by Imagic in 1982. The objective is to gather specimens from different planets in a spaceship which contains the survivors from the city of Atlantis. There are two versions of the cartridge. One allows the player to toggle the starfield display with the Black & White / Color TV switch. In the other the starfield cannot be disabled.

Gameplay

In the first stage, the player must fend off meteor showers from all four sides of the screen by pushing the joystick to fire in the desired direction, similar to the 1980 arcade game Space Zap. The second stage requires the player to pilot a shuttle to a planet and use its tractor beam to pick up life forms. While near the planet's surface, planetary defenses will fire at the shuttle. If hit, one previously captured specimen will be freed, forcing the player to retrieve another. After a set period of time, a klaxon will warn of renewed meteor activity, and the player must return immediately to defend the ark.

Cosmic Ark does not provide a set number of lives. Instead, the player's ark starts with 40 fuel units, which are lost with each meteor strike or shot fired, and gained by destroying a meteor or capturing a life form. Capturing both life forms from a planet before the warning klaxon will top off fuel reserves. If the ark runs out of energy, the next hit it takes will end the game.

Like its predecessor, Atlantis, Cosmic Ark ends with the destruction of the Ark but the smaller shuttle ship escaping. This plot thread was not continued in other Imagic games.

Development
According to Fulop, the game was created entirely as a feat of technical one-upmanship: to show off the impressive background starfield effect to Activision programmers David Crane and Bob Whitehead. The starfield effect uses a bug in the Atari 2600 hardware.

Reception
Richard A. Edwards reviewed Cosmic Ark in The Space Gamer No. 59. Edwards commented that "Overall, it is difficult to praise Cosmic Ark, though it can be fun at first. It is doubtful that this game will be played enough to justify its price, so perhaps it should be passed by."

Reviews
TeleMatch (Jan, 1983)
Electronic Fun with Computers & Games (Feb, 1983)
Tilt (Mar, 1983)

References

External links
Cosmic Ark at Atari Mania

1982 video games
Atari 2600 games
Atari 2600-only games
Imagic games
Video games developed in the United States
Multiplayer and single-player video games
Video games set in outer space
Science fiction video games